Rufino Enéas Gustavo Galvão, Viscount of Maracaju was a Brazilian military officer and politician who fought in the Paraguayan War, served as Provincial President of three different Brazilian provinces, as the Minister of War of Brazil and as a member of the Superior Military Court of Brazil.

As a military officer, he participated in the battles of Ytororó and Avay, he was the Chief of the Engineering Commission which after the Paraguayan War marked the new border with Paraguay, where serving with distinction, he earned the title of Baron of Maracaju. His highest achieved rank was that of Marshal, however as he was demoted in the Proclamation of the Republic he died in the rank of Lieutenant-General.

As a politician, he was President of the Province of Amazonas (7 March 1879 - 27 August 1879), President of the Province of Mato Grosso (5 December 1879 - 2 May 1881), President of the Province of Pará (16 December 1882 - 11 May 1883), Minister of War in three different periods (7 June 1889 - 2 September 1889 | 1 October 1889 - 17 October 1889 | 12 November 1889 - 15 November 1889), and after the Proclamation of the Republic, Minister of the Superior Military Court.

Biography
Galvão was the son of José Antônio da Fonseca Galvão and Mariana Clementina de Vasconcelos Galvão, brother of Antônio Eneas Gustavo Galvão , baron of Rio Apa, and judge Manuel do Nascimento da Fonseca Galvão .

He was governor of the provinces of Amazonas, named by imperial letter of January 19, 1878, from 7 March 1878 to 26 August 1879, from Mato Grosso and Pará from 16 of December of 1882 the 1884 , and Minister of War in 1889, having commanded the delimitation of the border between Brazil and Paraguay. He was also a minister of the Superior Military Court.

References

Further reading
Fala com que abriu no dia 25 de agosto de 1878 a 1.ª sessão da 14.ª legislatura da Assembleia Legislativa Provincial do Amazonas o exmo. sr. Barão de Maracaju, presidente da província
Exposição com que o exmo. sr. Barão de Maracaju , presidente da província do Amazonas, entregou a administração em 26 de agosto de 1879 ao exmo. sr. dr. Romualdo de Sousa Pais de Andrade

1831 births
1909 deaths
Brazilian monarchists
Brazilian nobility
Conservative Party (Brazil) politicians
Marshals of Brazil
Brazilian military personnel of the Paraguayan War
Supreme Federal Court of Brazil justices
Governors of Amazonas (Brazilian state)
Governors of Mato Grosso
Governors of Pará (Empire of Brazil)
Politicians from Rio de Janeiro (city)